P. A. Pematilaka was the 37th Auditor General of Sri Lanka. He was appointed on 23 October 2006, succeeding Sarath Chandrasiri Mayadunne, and held the office until 3 January 2007. He was succeeded by S. Swarnajothi.

References

Auditors General of Sri Lanka